Norway competed at the 1924 Summer Olympics in Paris, France. 62 competitors, 60 men and 2 women, took part in 43 events in 10 sports.

Medalists

Athletics

Ten athletes represented Norway in 1924. It was the nation's fifth appearance in the sport as well as the Games. Hansen took the nation's only athletics medal of the Games, with a bronze in the long jump.

Ranks given are within the heat.

Boxing 

Nine boxers represented Norway at the 1924 Games. It was the nation's second appearance in the sport. Von Porat became Norway's first Olympic boxing champion. Sørsdal, who had won a silver medal in 1920 to become Norway's first medalist in the sport, won his second medal (a bronze).

Fencing

Four fencers, all men, represented Norway in 1924. It was the nation's third appearance in the sport, and first since 1912. Heide and Lorentzen became the first Norwegian fencers to reach the semifinals.

 Men

Ranks given are within the pool.

Modern pentathlon

Two pentathletes represented Norway in 1924. It was the nation's third appearance in the sport. Norway was one of six nations to have competed in each edition of the Olympic modern pentathlon to that point.

Sailing

Nine sailors, the maximum possible, represented Norway in 1924. It was the nation's fourth appearance in the sport. All three Norwegian boats won medals, with two taking gold and one earning silver. It was the second consecutive Games that each Norwegian boat had medalled.

Shooting

Swimming

Ranks given are within the heat.

 Men

Tennis

 Men

 Women

 Mixed

Wrestling

Greco-Roman

 Men's

Art Competitions

References

External links
Official Olympic Reports
International Olympic Committee results database

Nations at the 1924 Summer Olympics
1924
1924 in Norwegian sport